The 2009–10 season was Blackburn Rovers' 122nd season as a professional football club. The 2009–10 season was Blackburn Rovers' 16th season in the Premier League, and their 9th consecutive season in the top division of English football.

Pre-season

Ins and outs
The end of the previous season saw the departure of first-team squad players. André Ooijer, Aaron Mokoena and Tugay Kerimoğlu all left the club on free transfers. With that in mind, Sam Allardyce wasted no time in bringing new additions into the club, with the signing of the South African international winger Elrio Van Heerden from Club Brugge on 2 June on a free transfer.

A few weeks later, Roque Santa Cruz signed for Manchester City, ending 12 months of speculation. Two days later, Matt Derbyshire completed a move to Olympiacos, where he had been on loan since January 2009. With the incoming cash, Blackburn quickly move to secure Gaël Givet to a permanent contract following his successful loan spell from Marseille in the second half of the prior season.

He was swiftly followed into Ewood Park by another free transfer, right-back Lars Jacobsen, who had been released from Everton following two years plagued by injury, and Steven Nzonzi, a central midfielder who joined from French club Amiens for an undisclosed fee.

With the departure of two strikers and the lack of depth shown up front the prior season by being forced to play Christopher Samba as a striker for the most part, the attention was then shifted to strengthening the frontline. After being linked to numerous big-name strikers such as Bojan, Ruud van Nistelrooy and Christian Vieri throughout the summer, Blackburn finally secured the signings of Franco Di Santo on loan and the permanent signing of Croatian striker Nikola Kalinić in early August. Due to the arrival of two new strikers, Paul Gallagher was allowed to leave the club, joining Championship side Leicester City in order to play regular first-team football.

In mid-August, Míchel Salgado became available on a free transfer after being released by Real Madrid. Given Allardyce's previous experience of prolonging older players careers, Salgado opted to join Blackburn. This would seemingly signal the end of any summer transfer activity as the board had requested that the wage bill be reduced and that a large amount of the transfer fees received from the sales of Santa Cruz and Derbyshire go towards paying off existing debt and supporting the upcoming season's wage bill.

However, after the season had begun, Aston Villa began to pursue Blackburn's previous player of the season, Stephen Warnock. Unable to resist the money on offer, Blackburn accepted the bid and allowed the player to leave. A reason behind allowing the move was that a ready replacement was already lined up, in the form of Pascal Chimbonda, who joined on the same day as Warnock departed.

Barring loan deals to lower league teams, this would mark the end of Blackburn's summer transfer activities.

Friendlies

 The matches against Nacional and Hajduk Split were both 45 minutes in length as part of a mini tournament.
 The match against Roma ended with a penalty shoot-out which Blackburn lost 3–2.

Premier League

August

At the end of August, Blackburn were sitting 18th in the table, taking only 1 point from a possible 9.

Pld = Matches played; W = Matches won; D = Matches drawn; L = Matches lost; F = Goals for; A = Goals against; GD = Goal difference; Pts = Points

September

From the September fixtures Blackburn had taken 6 points from a possible 9 and moved up to 13th in the table.

Pld = Matches played; W = Matches won; D = Matches drawn; L = Matches lost; F = Goals for; A = Goals against; GD = Goal difference; Pts = Points

October

From the October fixtures Blackburn had taken 3 points from a possible 12 and moved down to 17th in the table.

Pld = Matches played; W = Matches won; D = Matches drawn; L = Matches lost; F = Goals for; A = Goals against; GD = Goal difference; Pts = Points

November

At the end of November Blackburn were sitting 13th in the table taking 7 points from a possible 12.

Pld = Matches played; W = Matches won; D = Matches drawn; L = Matches lost; F = Goals for; A = Goals against; GD = Goal difference; Pts = Points

December

At the end of December Blackburn remained 13th in the table taking 4 points from a possible 18.

Pld = Matches played; W = Matches won; D = Matches drawn; L = Matches lost; F = Goals for; A = Goals against; GD = Goal difference; Pts = Points

January

At the end of January Blackburn were sitting 10th in the table taking 7 points from a possible 12.

Pld = Matches played; W = Matches won; D = Matches drawn; L = Matches lost; F = Goals for; A = Goals against; GD = Goal difference; Pts = Points

February

At the end of February Blackburn were sitting 10th in the table taking 6 points from a possible 12.

Pld = Matches played; W = Matches won; D = Matches drawn; L = Matches lost; F = Goals for; A = Goals against; GD = Goal difference; Pts = Points

March

At the end of March Blackburn were sitting 10th in the table taking 7 points from a possible 12.

Pld = Matches played; W = Matches won; D = Matches drawn; L = Matches lost; F = Goals for; A = Goals against; GD = Goal difference; Pts = Points

April

At the end of April Blackburn were sitting 11th in the table taking 3 points from a possible 12.

Pld = Matches played; W = Matches won; D = Matches drawn; L = Matches lost; F = Goals for; A = Goals against; GD = Goal difference; Pts = Points

May

At the end of the season Blackburn finished 10th in the table taking a maximum 6 points out of 6 in May.

{| class="wikitable" style="text-align:center;border:1px solid #AAAAAA;font-size:90%"
!width=30|
!Club
!width=30|
!width=30|
!width=30|
!width=30|
!width=30|
!width=30|
!width=30|
!width=30|
|-
|10||align=left|Blackburn Rovers
|38||13||11||14||41||55||-14||50
|}
Pld = Matches played; W = Matches won; D = Matches drawn; L = Matches lost; F = Goals for; A = Goals against; GD = Goal difference; Pts = Points

Results by round

Final league table

FA Cup

Third round

Both managers seemed to have placed the mid-week League Cup semi-final higher on the priority list as, between them, they made a total of 16 changes from the teams that started their previous matches.

Villa's line-up was the stronger of the two and the home side went ahead after 12 minutes. Cutting in from the left, Ashley Young centred the ball to Nathan Delfouneso, who opened the scoring with a straightforward header from 10 yards out. Young could have extended the lead himself before Villa conceded a penalty when Nigel Reo-Coker was adjudged to have brought down Steven Reid, but Brad Guzan saved from David Dunn. The miss was made worse when Young's free-kick was glanced in by Carlos Cuéllar to give Villa a 2–0 lead six minutes later. Things got even bleaker for Rovers when El-Hadji Diouf was given a straight red card before the break when he recklessly brought down Habib Beye.

Blackburn's attempts to get back into the match were given an unexpected lift when Guzan dropped an inswinging corner to allow Nikola Kalinić to score. Villa suddenly looked perturbed and Kalinić could have levelled matters after being sent clear by substitute Morten Gamst Pedersen, but Villa restored their authority when Reo-Coker had a shot turned round the post and, in the 90th minute, Gaël Givet brought down John Carew in the box with the Norwegian sending Rovers keeper Jason Brown the wrong way from the spot to send Blackburn crashing out at the first hurdle.

League Cup

Second round

As one of the 13 Premier League teams not involved in European competition, Blackburn entered at the second round along with the winners from the first round plus Newcastle United and Middlesbrough, who also received a first round bye. The draw for the second round took place on 12 August, after the first round had been completed. Blackburn were drawn away to Gillingham; the match was played on 25 August.

Blackburn started the game brightly and, within 5 minutes, were 1–0 up when David Dunn slotted home Nikola Kalinić's through ball. Gillingham pressed for an equaliser and went closest when Mark McCammon headed just wide. Two minutes after the break, Rovers doubled their lead when Keith Andrews crossed the ball for David Hoilett to score his first goal for the club with a diving header. In the 70th minute Zurab Khizanishvili brought down Simeon Jackson in the box; Jackson himself got back up and scored from the spot to bring Gillingham back into the game. It proved not to be for Gillingham as Blackburn's progress into the next round was sealed 4 minutes later when Morten Gamst Pedersen scored direct from a corner on the right hand side.

Third round

The draw for the third round took place on 29 August, after the second round had been played. The seven Premier League teams involved in European competition entered at this stage, joined by the winners from the second round. Blackburn were drawn away to Nottingham Forest; the tie was played on 22 September.

Both teams created a few chances in an opening period where Forest looked more than a match for their Premiership rivals, although it was Blackburn who took the lead in the 37th minute when Benni McCarthy's cross-cum-shot-cum-free kick bypassed everyone in the box and nestled in the far corner.  Forest were nearly level soon after when Robert Earnshaw's freekick struck the corner of the goal frame with Jason Brown beaten. Forest continued to press after the break and were awarded a penalty on 70 minutes when Steven Reid handled in the box. Dexter Blackstock stepped up to take the penalty but it was saved by Jason Brown. In the 90th minute Earnshaw had an even better chance to draw his team level but managed to blast over from a yard out.

Fourth round

The draw for the fourth round took place after the third-round games had been played, on 26 September; the matches were played in the week beginning 26 October. Blackburn were drawn at home to Championship side Peterborough.

Sam Allardyce opted to make seven changes from the team beaten at Chelsea and was swiftly rewarded when Morten Gamst Pedersen rifled home a free kick in the fourth minute. Peterborough fought back and after a dangerous free kick of their own equalised when Chris Whelpdale headed Chris Rowe's cross back across Jason Brown and into the back of the net. Just before half-time Peterborough were reduced to ten men when goalkeeper Joe Lewis was sent off when he brought down Pedersen after a defensive header had fallen short. Steven Reid stepped up to take the penalty and, despite slipping whilst taking the kick, still scored.

5 minutes after the restart Peterborough once again got themselves on level terms when George Boyd hit a fierce left-foot effort past Brown. The game was effectively ended as a contest in the 57th minute when Míchel Salgado collected Brett Emerton's pass and blasted in his first goal in English football. In the 72nd minute Benni McCarthy calmly slid the ball past substitute keeper James McKeown after being put through by Nikola Kalinić and, when Blackburn were awarded a penalty for handball two minutes later, Kalinić stepped up to the spot and converted for his first goal for the club. Blackburn were successfully through to the fifth round for the third successive season.

Fifth round

The fifth round draw took place on 31 October, with Blackburn being handed a home tie against Chelsea. The match was played on 2 December.

The tie started at a fast and frenetic pace, with both teams showing a willingness to attack from the opening whistle. Nikola Kalinić shot wide under pressure from Ferreira shortly before his ninth-minute opener, a well-constructed goal that saw Morten Gamst Pedersen play in Pascal Chimbonda, who in turn drilled the ball low across the face of goal for Kalinić to slot home. Chelsea were unusually wasteful in possession and struggled to create clear-cut openings. Even so, Salomon Kalou, Mikel John Obi, Joe Cole, Michael Ballack and Yuri Zhirkov all either forced regulation saves from Paul Robinson or missed the target before the break. Kalou's miss was the most glaring, heading wide from six yards at the far post.

Carlo Ancelotti made a bold triple substitution at half-time, introducing Jeffrey Bruma, Gaël Kakuta and Didier Drogba. It looked like a good decision as, after being on the pitch for just three minutes, Drogba climbed above Ryan Nelsen to head home Florent Malouda's cross. Four minutes later, Chelsea took the lead when Zhirkov collected a loose ball and released Kalou, who closed in on goal before slotting the ball beyond Robinson. Rovers levelled in the 64th minute when Kalinić attempted to head Brett Emerton's deflected cross at the near post. The striker didn't appear to get anything on the ball but, regardless, did enough to distract Hilario and the ball went in at the far post.

Chelsea were reduced to ten men when Kalou limped off; due to the triple change at half-time, they were unable to bring on a replacement. Rovers thought they had snatched a dramatic victory in injury-time but McCarthy's effort was ruled out for offside. Kalinić then forced a good save from Hilário but Chelsea survived to take the match into extra-time.

Rovers' pressure eventually told when the home team regained the lead from the penalty spot early in extra-time. Zhirkov clearly fouled substitute David Hoilett and McCarthy sent Hilário the wrong way from the penalty spot. Ferreira equalised with just about the last action of extra time with a neat finish from a tight angle after Robinson had flapped at a cross.

Kakuta missed the crucial spot kick as Rovers won the shoot-out 4–3 to seal a place in the last four. The 18-year-old struck the ball straight at Paul Robinson, who had earlier sensationally tipped Michael Ballack's spot kick on to the post.

Semi-final

Originally scheduled for 5 January 2010, the first leg was postponed as police advised that the travelling conditions for both sets of supporters were unsafe. The game was rearranged for 14 January.

First–team squadUpdated 28 January 2010 

 

 

                             

Left club during season

 

Squad statistics

Appearances and goals
Current squad

Former playersSubstitution appearances in brackets''

Last Update: 31 January 2010
Data does not include appearances/goals obtained whilst at another club 
Substitution appearances in (brackets)
League – Premier League
FA Cup – FA Cup
League Cup – League Cup

Starting formations
 As of 31 January 2010 

Top scorer
 As of 28 January 2010 

Most appearances
 As of 6 May 2010 

Substitution appearances counted as full

DisciplineCurrent squad As of 13 May 2010 Former players'''

Transfers

In

Out

Loaned in

Loaned out

Notes

References

External links
Official Club site
The Daily Rover – Fan Driven Website
Player Statistics – Official Club Site

2009–10 Premier League by team
2009-10